The women's cycling sprint at the 2011 Dutch National Track Championships in Apeldoorn took place at Omnisport Apeldoorn on December 28, 2011. 5 athletes participated in the contest.

Yvonne Hijgenaar won the gold medal, Willy Kanis took silver and Shanne Braspennincx won the bronze.

Competition format
The sprint event was a single-elimination tournament after seeding via time trial. Each match pits two cyclists against each other in the best-of-three races. Each race consisted of three laps of the track with side-by-side starts.

Results

Qualification
A 200 m time trial with a flying start. The top 4 athletes advanced to the semi-finals.

Semi-finals
The winners advanced to the finals, the other two competed for the bronze medal and fourth place.

Match 1

Match 2

Finals
Bronze medal match

Gold medal match

Final results

Results from uci.ch and nkbaanwielrennen.nl.

References

2011 Dutch National track cycling championships
Dutch National Track Championships – Women's sprint